Walter Denny may refer to:
Walter B. Denny, American historian
Walter M. Denny (1853–1926), American politician